Swimming at the 2012 Paralympic Games was held from 30 August to 8 September 2012 at the London Aquatics Centre in London, UK. The competition consisted of 148 events, across multiple classifications, and all swum in a long course (50m) pool. Up to 600 swimmers (340 males, 260 females) swum in the Games.

Participating nations
On 23 May 2012, IPC Swimming announced that 66 nations had qualified for the 2012 Paralympics. Those nations (and their slot allocations) are:

Event schedule

Medal summary

Medal table

Medals

Men's events

Women's events

References

 
2012 Summer Paralympics events
2012 in swimming
2012
Swimming competitions in the United Kingdom